Buan is a community in the Welsh county of Gwynedd, located on the Llŷn Peninsula.  It includes the villages of Boduan and Rhydyclafdy, and has a population of 469, increasing to 484 at the 2011 Census. Other settlements include Ceidio, Llandudwen and Llanfihangel Bachellaeth.

History
In 1870–72 the Imperial Gazetteer of England and Wales by John Marius Wilson described Buan as:

Geography and demographics
Buan is located in the south-western central part of Gwynedd on the Llŷn Peninsula, in North West Wales, and includes the villages of Boduan and Rhydyclafdy. The landscape is dominated by farms and woodland. According to the 2011 census, the community of Buan had a population of 484 people (250 males and 234 females). In addition, there are 195 households in the community with a population density of 0.1 per hectare. Christianity was the majority religion in the area with two people stating they followed other religions. Of Buan's 484 residents, 84.1% described their health as either "good" or "very good", and of those aged between 16 and over, 18.8% had no academic qualifications or one GCSE, lower than the figures for all of  Gwynedd (23.2%) and Wales (25.9%).

The community includes the Marilyn and hill fort of Garn Boduan.

Governance
In local government Buan is governed by Gwynedd Council, and is in the Efailnewydd/Buan ward, which is part of the Dwyfor electoral district. At the national level Buan is in the Welsh parliamentary constituency of Dwyfor Meirionnydd, for which Liz Saville-Roberts (Plaid Cymru) has been MP since 2015. In the general election of 2015 Saville-Roberts won 11,790 votes (40.9%), giving her a majority of 5,261; the Conservative Party won 6,550 (22.7%) and the Labour Party won 3,904 votes (13.5%), while the United Kingdom Independence Party took 3,126 votes (10.8%). The Independent candidate Louise Hughes, the Liberal Democrats and the Green Party each won fewer than 2,000 votes, Hughes performed slightly better of all three. In the Senedd Buan is in the constituency of Dwyfor Meirionnydd for which Dafydd Elis-Thomas has been the Member of the Senedd since its creation in 2007.

Education
Ysgol Rhydyclafdy School was the only primary school in the community and closed in 2008 due to a falling number in pupils and as part of a programme that saw two additional schools being closed on the  Llŷn Peninsula. Gwynedd Council allowed the building to be reopened as a nursery with community facilities two years later.

Notable landmarks

The following are the listed buildings in Buan. The listings are graded:

 AA Telephone Box (II)
 Bryniau (II)
 Bryntirion (II)
 Capel Rhydyclafdy (II)
 Cefniwrch (II)
 Church of St Buan (II)
 Church of St Ceidio (II)
 Church of St Michael (II)
 Church of St Tudwen (II*)
 Direction Sign at Inkerman Bridge (II) - Delisted in October 2022
 E Farmyard Range including water-wheel at Nant Farm (II)
 Efail Gledrydd (II)
 Efail Gledrydd Forge (II)
 Gallt-y-beren (II)
 Glanrafon (II)
 Gwnhinger (II)
 Lodge to N of Plas Boduan (II)
 Lychgate and churchyard wall to Church of St Tudwen (II)
 Madryn Castle Gatehouse (II)
 Meillionen Farmhouse (II)
 Milestone by Tuhwnt i'r Gors (II)
 Nant Farm (II)
 Neuadd Bogdadle (II)
 No 1 Tan-y-fron (II)
 No 3 Tan-y-fron (II)
 Out-buildings at Home Farm, Plas Boduan (II)
 Penhyddgan (II*)
 Plas Boduan (II)
 Pont Rhydyclafdy (II)
 Roadsign SE of Bogdadle (II)
 S Farmyard Range at Nant Farm (II)
 The Cock-loft (II)
 Ty Capel Rhydyclafdy (II)
 Ty Isaf (NW Cottage) (II)
 Ty Isaf (SE Cottage) (II)
 Tyn-y-coed Isaf (II)

Buan contains 34 Grade II listed buildings, in addition to two Grade II* listed buildings. The former church of the same name, St Buan, was built in 1765, and is reminiscent of the Romanesque style in design. The church was later deconsecrated and sold in 2004.

References